Carel Bernardus Dankmeijer, known as Charles (1861-1923) was a Dutch painter; best known for his colorful cityscapes and river scenes.

Biography 
He took his first drawing lessons at the Felix Meritis Society of Amsterdam. In 1881, he went to Antwerp, where he studied at the Royal Academy of Fine Arts with Charles Verlat and won the "Prix d'Excellence". From 1882 to 1886, he was enrolled at the Rijksakademie. His professors there were August Allebé and Barend Wijnveld. He then joined the artists' colony in  Laren, and came under the influence of Anton Mauve.

After Mauve's death, he returned to Amsterdam and was married. For many years after that, he moved frequently; living in The Hague, Loosduinen, Zaandam, Renkum (where he worked with Théophile de Bock), Oosterbeek, Leiden and, finally, Scheveningen. This was interspersed with travels to France and Italy. In 1900, he won a medal at the Exposition Universelle.

A slightly eccentric man, it was said that you could tell what colors were on his palette from the stains on his jacket. When inspired, he often walked through town so lost in thought that he would not even recognize his friends.

Gallery

References

Further reading 
 Maarten Bol: Charles Dankmeijer 1861-1923. een gedreven, kleurrijk schilder, Renkum 2002.

External links 

ArtNet: More works by Dankmeijer.

1861 births
1923 deaths
19th-century Dutch painters
Dutch male painters
20th-century Dutch painters
Painters from Amsterdam
Cityscape artists
Dutch landscape painters
19th-century Dutch male artists
20th-century Dutch male artists